Vaals is a town in the extreme southeastern part of the Dutch province of Limburg, which is in the southeastern part of the Netherlands. 

It borders on both Belgium and Germany. The three borders meet on the Drielandenpunt, a few meters from the highest point in the European part of the Netherlands, the Vaalserberg. The Vaalserberg used to be called "Hubertusberg".

History 

Its occupation in ancient Roman times might be recorded by its name itself which comes from Latin 'vallis'. It is one of the few places in the Netherlands with a name deriving from Latin. In Roman times, the south of the Dutch province of Limburg was a densely populated part of the Roman empire, with its regional focus on Cologne (Colonia Claudia Ara Agrippinensium), for a while even capital of the Western Roman Empire. 

About two million years ago, the area surrounding Vaals was relatively flat. The Meuse river ran past the villages of Eijsden, Epen and Vijlen towards the North-East. This changes when the Bulge arose, geologically. The area surrounding Vaals rose over Maastricht and the Meuse river was redirected there. The many small rivers feeding the Meuse river eventually formed the landscape that is currently known as the "Heuvelland".

Vaals has been inhabited for a very long time. Near the Vijlener Forest, archeological traces have been found that indicate that the area was inhabited between 5000 BC. Vaals is first mentioned in documents in 1041. The village is then called either Vals or Vallis, meaning valley. In that time, Emperor Henry III donated land to the St. Adalbert Abbey and to distinguish between the city of Aachen and this land, it is referred to as "in the valley" – in Vallis. In those days, the centre of the municipality was Holset, also home to a high court of justice. Given the location of the municipality, Vaals observed many armies passing by. Some of them did not idly pass by. During the war against the Spanish occupation, in 1568, the armed forces of William of Orange passed through Vaals and looted St. Paul's Church. 

In 1661 Vaals became a part of the Republic of the United Netherlands. Many wealthy citizens moved to Vaals and turned it into a prosperous industrial hub. A prominent industrial family were the Von Clermonts, who moved from Aachen to Vaals in 1761 and established a large linen factory, with clientele in Prussia, Belgium, Austria, Poland and even Russia. In 1717, Tsar Peter the Great visited the Von Clermonts. In 1803, Napoleon Bonaparte, Emperor of France, and his wife Josephine de Beauharnais visited Vaals and stayed in Bloemendal Castle, one of the outhouses of the Von Clermont family. Unofficially, Vaals was adopted into the Kingdom of the Netherlands in 1815, by Governor Sack. Vaals had to orient itself more towards Holland and had to correspond in Dutch from then on. 

During the Conference of Vienna, it was decided that Aachen was assigned to Prussia and Vaals to the Kingdom of the Netherlands. When Belgium declared itself independent in 1830, Vaals was a part of Belgium until 1839. From 1839 onwards Vaals was reassigned to the Kingdom of the Netherlands. Near Vaals four national boundaries, those of Prussia, Belgium, the Netherlands and the Neutral Territory of Moresnet, met. While Moresnet had a flag (Black-White-Blue), it did not have a head of state or a government. As a result of the less than nation-state of Moresnet, in those days at Vaals there was a Four-Border-Point, but not a Four-Country-Point. The Viergrenzenweg ("Four-Borders-Road") still exists in Vaals, a reminder of this era, lasting from 1839 to 1919, after which Moresnet was absorbed into Belgium. 

Due to increased competition and the political closure of the German and Belgian hinterland to Vaals, industrial activity went down after 1840. Vaals turned from a wealthy industrial town into a leisure and holiday destination for the citizens of Aachen, slightly resembling Monte Carlo because of its casinos. Germans referred to the town as the "Vaalser Paradies". To stimulate industry and tourism, a tram was installed in 1922 from Aachen, via Vaals to Wijlre, which was expanded to Maastricht in 1924.

Before and during World War II the borders were closed and Vaals grew isolated due to its remote location in the Netherlands. After the war, commerce rose again. Germans visited Vaals on a daily basis, a trade exchange still taking place today. Many inhabitants of Vaals found jobs in Aachen and smuggle routes across the border prospered. The smugglers of Vaals were called "The Owls of Vaals", referring to their nightly endeavours. To this day, Vaals is a tourist site, gathering its income mostly from German, Belgian and Dutch tourists, as well as being a shopping centre for especially Germans. In fact, the village of Vaals can be interpreted as a Dutch suburb to the German city of Aachen. A quarter of the inhabitants are German and the village is well embedded in the Aachen local transport system. The dialect of Vaals is a part of the Middle German Dialects and is the form of Dutch most deviant from Standard Dutch. Together with the dialect of Cologne, it is a part of the Ripuarian language family. It sounds more German than Dutch, partially explained because German has been the shared cultural language of the municipality for centuries, and in some ways, it still is.

Population 
In the municipality of Vaals, there are four villages and nine townships. Due to Vaals being located near the German border, the population of German people represents 26% of the total population of Vaals.

Villages 
Number of inhabitants per 1/1/2005:

Hamlets 
Next to these official villages and towns, the Vaals municipality also hosts a number of townships:

Politics 

No other district in Netherlands has a higher portion of German inhabitants (26%) than does Vaals. In the local elections on 7 March 2006, Georg Götz—a German citizen with the "Burgerbelang" (Civil Interests) party—was elected into the local council, a first in the history of the Netherlands. On 3 March 2010, he repeated his success with his own party "Betaalbaar & Duurzaam Vaals" (B&DV, Affordable & Sustainable Vaals). Babette Lemmer, a fellow German citizen, from "Vrij & Onafhankelijk" (V&O, Free & Independent) was also elected into the local council. Since that time, Vaals has been administered by a coalition of PvdA (social democrats), B&DV, and V&O.

Economy 
Tourism is regarded as the main source of income for Vaals. The neighbouring coal industry and textile industry were to a large extent lost starting from the 1960s. Most inhabitants commute today to the larger neighbouring cities of Heerlen, Kerkrade and Maastricht as well as to Aachen and surroundings. A sixth of the population is classified as poor in the current national poverty monitor of the Netherlands.

Notable people
 John Bröcheler (born 1945 in Vaals) a bass baritone opera singer
 Eddy Verheijen (born 1946 in Vaals) a retired speed skater, competed at the 1972 Winter Olympics
 Ronald Waterreus (born 1970 in Lemiers) a Dutch former football goalkeeper with 423 club caps

See also
Saint Paul's Church, Vaals

Gallery

References

External links 

Official website

 
Municipalities of Limburg (Netherlands)
Populated places in Limburg (Netherlands)
South Limburg (Netherlands)
Belgium–Netherlands border crossings
Germany–Netherlands border crossings